The genus Colymboides contains three species of early loon dating from the late Oligocene or early Miocene. They are considered to be the earliest known unambiguous gaviiform fossils. It is usually placed in the Gaviidae already, but usually in a subfamily Colymboidinae, with the modern-type loons making up the Gaviinae. But the Colymboides material is generally quite distinct from modern loons, and may actually belong in a now-extinct family of primitive gaviiforms. The best studied species, Colymboides minutus, was described by Robert Storer as being much smaller than modern loons and not as well adapted to diving.

Notes

References

Gaviiformes
Miocene birds
Fossil taxa described in 1867
Priabonian first appearances
Burdigalian extinctions